A physical test is a qualitative or quantitative procedure that consists of determination of one or more characteristics of a given product, process or service according to a specified procedure. Often this is part of an experiment.

Physical testing is common in physics, engineering, and quality assurance.

Purposes
Physical testing might have a variety of purposes, such as:
 if, or verify that, the requirements of a specification, regulation, or contract are met
 Decide if a new product development program is on track: Demonstrate proof of concept
 Demonstrate the utility of a proposed patent
 Provide standard data for other scientific, engineering, and quality assurance functions
 Validate suitability for end-use
 Provide a basis for  Technical communication
 Provide a technical means of comparison of several options
 Provide evidence in legal proceedings

Performance testing
Some physical testing is performance testing which covers a wide range of engineering or functional evaluations where a material, product, or system is not specified by detailed material or component specifications. Rather, emphasis is on the final measurable performance characteristics. Testing can be a qualitative or quantitative procedure.
Many Acceptance testing protocols employ performance testing e.g. In the stress testing of a new design of chair.

Examples of performance testing
 Structural testing: building and Construction Performance Testing
 Fire protection (ASTM D176)
 Packaging Performance (hazardous materials, dangerous goods, ASTM D4169) 
 Performance Index for Tires (ASTM F538)
 Performance Test Code on Compressors and Exhausters (ASME PTC 10 - 1997)
 Personal protective equipment performance
 Several Defense Standards
 Wear of Textiles (ASTM D123)

Gallery

See also
 Environmental chamber
 Test method
Independent test organization
Measurement uncertainty

References

 Pyzdek, T, "Quality Engineering Handbook", 2003,  
 Godfrey, A. B., "Juran's Quality Handbook", 1999, 

Metrology
Measurement
Quality control
Tests
Product testing